"Raising Hell" is a song by American singer Kesha featuring American rapper Big Freedia. It was released as the lead single from Kesha's fourth studio album High Road on October 24, 2019.

Background and promotion
On October 18, 2019, fans were prompted to call a hotline where the singer recorded a message to announce her return to music. On October 21, 2019, Rolling Stone posted a video clip with the announcement of Kesha's upcoming album High Road. Two days later, Kesha uploaded a trailer of the music video to her Instagram, revealing the release date to be October 24. The song was remixed for club and mix show radio play by Pink Panda, Justin Caruso, Steve James, The Wild, Dirty Werk, Robert Eibach and Danny Morris.  It peaked at number 5 on the Billboard Dance Club Songs Chart on February 14, 2020.

Composition
"Raising Hell" fuses pop, pop rock, gospel, EDM and bounce into a "Pink-esque" composition. It has been compared to the single "Timber", which Kesha was featured on. Described as combining the musical styles of Kesha's first two studio albums and her third, Rainbow, it features beat drops accompanied by "soaring synth beats", gospel choirs, handclaps, a church organ, horns, and a post-chorus by Freedia.

Critical reception
“Raising Hell” was met with positive reviews from critics, with many deeming it a triumphant return for the pop star.

Gil Kaufman, writing for Billboard, called the song "an all-time keeper". Lars Gotrich of NPR wrote the song "sounds like dollar sign-era Ke$ha with some of the hard-won hindsight from 2017's optimistic, healing Rainbow". Jael Goldfine of Paper called the song "a wonderful midpoint between snarling party girl Kesha half-rapping over crunchy pop-EDM and her soulful balladry on Rainbow".

Music video
The music video for "Raising Hell" was directed by Luke Gilford. The video portrays Kesha as a televangelist, loved by the people who she preaches to, but is married to an abusive husband. One night, Kesha tries to seduce her drunk husband but is almost choked to death until he is stabbed in the head. Kesha then drags the dead body to the trunk of her car, dyes her hair dark brown, and flees to a motel out of town. She is then wanted for murder and is chased by the police until she is eventually caught and arrested for killing her husband.

Live performances
Kesha and Big Freedia performed the song for the first time on Jimmy Kimmel Live! on October 28, 2019.

The duo performed the song at the 2019 American Music Awards, followed by a performance of "Tik Tok". At one point, her performance became the most tweeted that night.

Track listing
Digital download and streaming
 "Raising Hell" (featuring Big Freedia)

Digital download and streaming (Justin Caruso remix)
 "Raising Hell" (Justin Caruso remix; featuring Big Freedia)

Digital download and streaming (Pink Panda remix)
 "Raising Hell" (Pink Panda remix; featuring Big Freedia)

Digital download and streaming (Steve James remix)
 "Raising Hell" (Steve James remix)

Digital download and streaming (The Wild remix)
 "Raising Hell" (The Wild remix)

Charts

Release history

References

2019 singles
2019 songs
American pop rock songs
Kesha songs
Songs written by Kesha
Songs written by Wrabel
Songs written by Sean Douglas (songwriter)
Songs written by Ajay Bhattacharya
RCA Records singles
Big Freedia songs